Novokopylovo is a rural locality (a selo) in Zhilinsky Selsoviet, Pervomaysky District, Altai Krai, Russia. The population was 148 as of 2013. There are 4 streets.

Geography 
Novokopylovo is located 46 km east of Novoaltaysk (the district's administrative centre) by road. Novochesnokovka is the nearest rural locality.

References 

Rural localities in Pervomaysky District, Altai Krai